Radio AF in Lund, Sweden, is the largest student radio station in Scandinavia, and the second largest in Europe.

Radio AF started broadcasting November 1, 1982. It broadcasts news aimed at the students at Lund University, and a wide variety of music. Radio AF was the start of the career of many Swedish radio personalities and comedians. The current station manager is Daniel Solvold. The station used to broadcast analog radio in the Lund area on 99.1 MHz and 91.1 MHz, but has since June 2014 moved on to round-the-clock broadcasting and podcasting via the official website.

About

Radio AF is run by volunteering students and broadcasts 24/7. The programming varies from music, news, comedy, talkshows and entertainment.

History

The city of Lund was given permission to start community radio broadcasting in 1982 and began broadcasts November 1, the same year. Among the first that went on air was Lunds Studentkår, the student body of Lund, and Akademiska Föreningen, the academic society, both combined under the name Radio LSAF. They broadcast more than eight hours a week, mainly music and student information. After a project under the name Radio P4 in the summer of 1984 along with Radio TLTH and Radio Concorde, the three stations joined under the name Radio AF.

One of the objectives of the project was to influence public opinion in the direction of a less restricted and more free radio climate, which led to 40,000 signatures in support of commercial advertisements on the newly started Radio P4.

Radio AF/P4 then continued throughout the eighties, calling themselves Radio P4 in the summer, with a more youthful profile, and Radio AF during the semesters, with focus on student information. Many of Sweden's biggest radio personalities originate from this time.

In June 1991, Radio AF moved to its current premises in the AF-building, centrally located in Lund, and began broadcasting on frequency 99.1 MHz. In 2014 the station aimed for an all digital approach to the content provided, and designed a new official site to further the programming of the channel digitally.

Station management

External links
Official website
Radio AF on Facebook

References

AF
Radio stations established in 1982
Mass media in Lund
1982 establishments in Sweden